Presidential elections were held in El Salvador between 14 and 16 January 1945. The result was a victory for Salvador Castaneda Castro of the Social Democratic Unification Party. The election was boycotted by five candidates who withdrew after accusing Osmín Aguirre y Salinas of unfair practices to ensure victory for his favoured candidate.

Results

References

Bibliography
Krehm, William (1957) Democracia y tiranias en el Caribe Buenos Aires: Editorial Parnaso
Larde y Larin, Jorge (1958) Guía histórica de El Salvador San Salvador: Ministerio de cultura
Herman, Edward S. and Frank Brodhead (1984) Demonstration elections: U.S.-staged elections in the Dominican Republic, Vietnam, and El Salvador Boston: South End Press
Political Handbook of the world, 1945 New York, 1946
Webre, Stephen (1979) José Napoleón Duarte and the Christian Democratic Party in Salvadoran Politics 1960-1972 Baton Rouge: Louisiana State University Press

El Salvador
Presidential elections in El Salvador
1945 in El Salvador
Election and referendum articles with incomplete results